Catherine Lacey (born April 9, 1985) is an American writer.

Career
Lacey's first novel, Nobody Is Ever Missing, was published by Farrar, Straus and Giroux. Dwight Garner, in The New York Times, called her prose "dreamy and fierce at the same time." Time Out New York named it "the (hands down) best book of the year." It also made The New Yorkers list for the best books of 2014. It has been translated into Dutch, Spanish,  Italian, French, and German. The novel was a finalist for the New York Public Library's Young Lions Fiction Award. In 2016, Lacey won a Whiting Award for her fiction.

In 2017 Lacey was named one of Granta's Best of Young American Novelists. Her second novel, The Answers, was published by Farrar, Straus and Giroux. It received several positive reviews and comparisons to Don Delillo and Margaret Atwood. In an interview with Vogue, Lacey said, "Even the person who wrote Nobody Is Ever Missing, I can’t really speak on her behalf anymore. The text is kind of what's left of that person, and that person doesn’t exist anymore. It both makes me very uncomfortable and very relaxed, because who you are and what you think that you’re attached to vanishes very quickly."

Lacey was a founding member of 3B, a cooperatively owned and operated bed and breakfast in downtown Brooklyn, where she lived as she wrote her first novel. In 2012 Lacey won an Artists' Fellowship from the New York Foundation for the Arts that she credits in giving her the financial freedom to finish Nobody Is Ever Missing.

Her 2020 novel, Pew, was shortlisted for the 2021 Dylan Thomas Prize and won the New York Public Library's Young Lions Fiction Award.

Personal life
In August 2015, she married actor and teacher Peter Musante; they divorced the next year. Lacey was partnered with writer Jesse Ball from 2016 to 2021. She has taught at Columbia University in the Writing Program at the School of the Arts.

Bibliography

Novels
  
  ,

Short fiction

Nonfiction

References

External links 

 Official website

21st-century American novelists
Novelists from Mississippi
Columbia University School of the Arts alumni
Living people
People from Tupelo, Mississippi
21st-century American women writers
Columbia University faculty
1985 births
Novelists from New York (state)
American women academics
American women novelists